Kerzaz is a district in Béchar Province, Algeria. It was named after its capital, Kerzaz. According to the 2008 census, the total population of the district was 9,876 inhabitants. Almost all of the population is settled near the Oued Saoura, which runs from northwest to southeast through the district. The main road, National Highway N6, also runs through the district from northwest to southeast on the way from Béchar to Adrar, Algeria.

Municipalities
The district is further divided into 3 municipalities:
Kerzaz
Timoudi
Béni Ikhlef

References

Districts of Béchar Province